
Year 324 (CCCXXIV) was a leap year starting on Wednesday (link will display the full calendar) of the Julian calendar. At the time, it was known as the Year of the Consulship of Crispus and Constantinus (or, less frequently, year 1077 Ab urbe condita). The denomination 324 for this year has been used since the early medieval period, when the Anno Domini calendar era became the prevalent method in Europe for naming years.

Events 
 By place 
 Roman Empire 
 July 3 – Battle of Adrianople: Emperor Constantine the Great defeats his rival Licinius near Adrianople, forcing him to retreat to Byzantium. He invades Thrace with a Visigothic force and raids the countryside. This sees Constantine ruling as sole Emperor.
 July – Battle of the Hellespont: Crispus destroys Licinius' naval fleet in the Dardanelles, allowing his father Constantine the ability to cross over the Bosphorus into Asian provinces. Byzantium is besieged and Licinius assembles a second military force, under his newly elevated co-emperor Martinian at Lampsacus (modern-day Lapseki).
 September 18 – Battle of Chrysopolis: Constantine I definitively defeats Licinius at Chrysopolis, and becomes sole Emperor, thus ending the period of the Tetrarchy. Licinius escapes and gathers around 30,000 of his surviving troops at Nicomedia.
 December 19 – Licinius abdicates his position as Emperor. He is pardoned by Constantine I as a result of the supplication of his wife Constantia (who is Constantine's halfsister), and banished to Thessalonica as a private citizen.

Births 
 Chu Suanzi, Chinese empress of the Jin dynasty (d. 384)

Deaths 
 Guo Pu, Chinese historian, poet and writer (b. 276)
 Wang Dun (or Chuzhong), Chinese warlord (b. 266)
 Zhang Mao, Chinese ruler of Former Liang (b. 277)

References